Arenac County is a county located in the U.S. state of Michigan. As of the 2020 Census, the population was 15,002. The county seat is Standish.

History
Arenac County was organized in 1883. The name Arenac, coined by Henry Rowe Schoolcraft, a US Indian Agent and ethnologist, is a derivation of the Latin arena and the Native American ac. The combined words mean “A sandy place for a good footing.”

The county includes some off-reservation trust lands held by the federal government for the federally recognized Saginaw Chippewa Tribal Nation, which is based in Isabella County. In early 2007, plans were confirmed for a casino to be constructed outside of the city of Standish with a scheduled opening by the end of the year. It is owned and operated by the Saginaw Chippewa Tribe. The Saganing Eagles Landing Casino grand opening was held on January 24, 2008.

Geography
It is the third-smallest county in Michigan by land area. Arenac County can be considered a part of either Northern Michigan or Central Michigan.

Geographic features
 Saginaw Bay on Lake Huron
 Au Gres River
 Rifle River
 Pine River (Arenac County)

Major highways

Adjacent counties
By land

 Iosco County (northeast)
 Bay County (south)
 Gladwin County (west)
 Ogemaw County (northwest)

By water

 Tuscola County (south)
 Huron County (southeast)

National protected area
 Michigan Islands National Wildlife Refuge (part)

Demographics

As of the 2000 United States Census, there were 17,269 people, 6,710 households, and 4,717 families in the county. The population density was 47 people per square mile (18/km2). There were 9,563 housing units at an average density of 26 per square mile (10/km2). The racial makeup of the county was 95.38% White, 1.82% Black or African American, 0.95% Native American, 0.29% Asian, 0.01% Pacific Islander, 0.21% from other races, and 1.33% from two or more races. 1.38% of the population were Hispanic or Latino of any race. 24.0% were of German, 14.1% Polish, 11.6% French, 10.6% American, 7.9% English, 6.8% Irish and 5.3% French Canadian ancestry. 96.9% spoke English and 1.3% Spanish as their first language.

There were 6,710 households, out of which 29.00% had children under the age of 18 living with them, 57.00% were married couples living together, 9.00% had a female householder with no husband present, and 29.70% were non-families. 25.50% of all households were made up of individuals, and 12.30% had someone living alone who was 65 years of age or older. The average household size was 2.45 and the average family size was 2.92.

The county population contained 23.30% under the age of 18, 7.80% from 18 to 24, 26.80% from 25 to 44, 25.50% from 45 to 64, and 16.60% who were 65 years of age or older. The median age was 40 years. For every 100 females there were 105.40 males. For every 100 females age 18 and over, there were 104.40 males.

The median income for a household in the county was $32,805, and the median income for a family was $39,033. Males had a median income of $31,205 versus $20,363 for females. The per capita income for the county was $16,300. About 11.30% of families and 13.90% of the population were below the poverty line, including 20.70% of those under age 18 and 7.80% of those age 65 or over.

Religion
 The Roman Catholic Diocese of Saginaw is the controlling regional body for the Catholic Church.
 There are no meetinghouses of the Church of Jesus Christ of Latter-day Saints located within Arenac County.

Government
Arenac County could be described as slightly Republican-leaning. Since 1884, the Republican Party nominee has carried the county vote in 53% of the elections (18 of 34 elections). Due to 3 elections won by independent candidates during that period, the Democratic record is only 38% (13 of 34).

The county government operates the jail, maintains rural roads, operates the major local courts, records deeds, mortgages, and vital records, administers public health regulations, and participates with the state in the provision of social services. The county board of commissioners controls the budget and has limited authority to make laws or ordinances. In Michigan, most local government functions — police and fire, building and zoning, tax assessment, street maintenance, etc. — are the responsibility of individual cities and townships.

Elected officials

 Prosecuting Attorney: Curtis Broughton
 Sheriff: Jim Mosciski
 County Clerk: Ricky R. Rockwell
 County Treasurer:  Dennis Stawowy
 Register of Deeds: Darlene Mikkola
 Drain Commissioner: Jeff Trombley
 Road Commissioners: Blair Dyer-Superintendent; Ken Stawowy-V. Chair; Lewis Ostrander; Olen Swartz-Chair

(information as of March 2009)

Communities

Cities
 Au Gres
 Omer
 Standish (county seat)

Villages
 Sterling
 Turner
 Twining

Civil townships

 Adams Township
 Arenac Township
 Au Gres Township
 Clayton Township
 Deep River Township
 Lincoln Township
 Mason Township
 Moffatt Township
 Sims Township
 Standish Township
 Turner Township
 Whitney Township

Unincorporated communities
 Alger
 Delano
 Maple Ridge
 Melita
 Pine River

Indian reservation
 Arenac County contains off-reservation trust land belonging to the Isabella Indian Reservation.  They occupy three small parcels of land located within Standish Township.

Events
 Sunrise Side Heritage Bike Ride, first weekend in September. Ride Along Lake Huron Shoreline (US 23) from the Arenac County fairgrounds to Mackinac Bridge then South to West Branch on M-33 and M-55 . This is a 400-mile long organized ride.

See also
 List of Michigan State Historic Sites in Arenac County, Michigan
 National Register of Historic Places listings in Arenac County, Michigan
 USS Arenac (APA-128)

References

Further reading

External links
 The Arenac County Independent
 Arenac County government
 

 
Michigan counties
1883 establishments in Michigan
Populated places established in 1883